Washibe is a village in the Karmala taluka of Solapur district in Maharashtra state, India.

Demographics
Covering  and comprising 561 households at the time of the 2011 census of India, Washibe had a population of 2782. There were 1466 males and 1316 females, with 324 people being aged six or younger.

References

Villages in Karmala taluka